Ivan Vasilyevich Fyodorov (21 September 1920 — 28 August 2000) was one of the top Soviet fighter pilots during World War II, credited with around 37 solo shootdowns.

References 

1920 births
2000 deaths
Heroes of the Soviet Union
Soviet World War II flying aces
Recipients of the Order of Lenin
Recipients of the Order of the Red Banner
Recipients of the Order of Alexander Nevsky
Recipients of the Order of the Red Star
Pilots who performed an aerial ramming